Portage Creek Airport  is a state-owned public-use airport in Portage Creek, located in the Dillingham Census Area of the U.S. state of Alaska. This airport is included in the FAA's National Plan of Integrated Airport Systems for 2011–2015, which categorized it as a general aviation airport.

Facilities and aircraft 
Portage Creek Airport has two runways with gravel/dirt surfaces: 10/28 is 1,920 by 60 feet (585 x 18 m) and 1/19 is 1,470 by 60 feet (448 x 18 m). For the 12-month period ending December 31, 2007, the airport had 700 air taxi aircraft operations, an average of 58 per month.

References

External links 
 FAA Alaska airport diagram (GIF)
 Topographic map from USGS The National Map

Airports in the Dillingham Census Area, Alaska